Avengers: The Initiative was a comic book series from Marvel Comics than ran from April 2007 to June 2010. The series focused on the training facility located at Camp Hammond in Stamford, Connecticut, where pro-registration heroes were trained for the Fifty State Initiative. Following is a list of characters who were featured in the series.

Camp Hammond staff

Other guest instructors and staff included: Ares, Ms. Marvel, and Wonder Man as part of the Mighty Avengers. Batroc the Leaper previously worked out of the Virginia training facility, and was set to be moved to Camp Hammond as a Martial arts instructor. He later returned to his life of crime as a mercenary. Gargoyle served as an Initiative instructor before retiring.

Camp Hammond recruits
There were an undetermined number of recruits at Camp Hammond before it closed; according to Henry Peter Gyrich and War Machine, there are over sixty super humans at Camp Hammond including staff. Recruits shown to be located at the camp include:

Other Initiative trainees
 Stature:
 Rocket Racer:
 Alex Power:
 Puma: Left to continue activity as a villain
 Challenger: Assigned to the Montana Initiative team, Freedom Force.
 Think Tank: Assigned to the Montana Initiative team, Freedom Force.
 Equinox: Assigned to the Montana Initiative team, Freedom Force. Revealed to be a Skrull infiltrator, and was killed by Cloud 9.
 Spinner: Assigned to the Montana Initiative team, Freedom Force. Believed killed trying to destroy a Skrull weapon system. Revealed to be alive in Fear Itself: Youth in Revolt.
 Shooting Star: Assigned to the Texas Initiative team, the Rangers.
 Blazing Skull: Assigned to the New Jersey Initiative team, the Defenders.
 Nonstop: Assigned to the Nevada Initiative team, the Heavy Hitters.
 Telemetry: Assigned to the Nevada Initiative team, the Heavy Hitters.
 Gravity: Assigned to the Nevada Initiative team, the Heavy Hitters. Transferred to the Great Lakes Initiative by Norman Osborn.
 Earth A Hulkling: Falsely joined The Initiative using his Earth-616 counterpart's identity, since returned home.
 Earth A Wiccan: Falsely joined The Initiative using his Earth-616 counterpart's identity, since returned home.

Camp H.A.M.M.E.R. staff

Other staff included Ares and Ms. Marvel (Moonstone) as part of the Dark Avengers. Baron Von Blitzschlag and Physique also retained the positions they had at Camp Hammond under Osborn's administration.

Camp H.A.M.M.E.R. recruits
Recruits shown to be part of Norman Osborn's Initiative include:

Other Camp H.A.M.M.E.R. trainees
 Percy Grimes
 Barton Grimes
 Cutthroat
 Mandrill
 Vampiro: Joined the Initiative to get out of prison. Killed by The Hood.
 Man-Killer

Shadow Initiative

The Shadow Initiative was created as a covert ops team, designed to handle unofficial field assignments. After Norman Osborn took over the Initiative and shut down Camp Hammond, the team was reorganized into a first strike team, containing heroes that were considered expendable.

Avengers Resistance

After Camp Hammond was shut down, Tigra and Gauntlet joined the New Warriors who had left the Initiative, and formed the Avengers Resistance, with the specific purpose of exposing the criminal deeds of Norman Osborn. Following Norman Osborne's arrest in the aftermath of the Siege of Asgard, the team disbanded.

References

Lists of Marvel Comics characters by organization
Lists of Avengers (comics) characters